Jarl Edvard Malmgren, born 12 September 1908 in Karis, Finland, died 5 June 1942 in East Karelia, Soviet Union, was a Finnish footballer who was killed in World War II.

Player career 
Malmgren played 8 seasons in the Finnish premier division Mestaruussarja for IFK Helsinki and was capped 31 times by the Finland national team. He was the captain of the Finland squad at the 1936 Summer Olympics in Berlin.

Club honours 
Finnish Championship: 1930, 1931, 1933, 1937

References 

1908 births
1942 deaths
Sportspeople from Uusimaa
Finnish footballers
Finland international footballers
Mestaruussarja players
HIFK Fotboll players
Footballers at the 1936 Summer Olympics
Olympic footballers of Finland
Finnish military personnel killed in World War II
Association football midfielders